The 2017–18 Towson Tigers men's basketball team represented Towson University during the 2017–18 NCAA Division I men's basketball season. The Tigers, led by seventh-year head coach Pat Skerry, played their home games at the SECU Arena in Towson, Maryland as members of the Colonial Athletic Association. They finished the season 18–14, 8–10 in CAA play to finish in fifth place. They lost in the quarterfinals of the CAA tournament to William & Mary.

Previous season
The Tigers finished the 2016–17 season 20–13, 11–7 in CAA play to finish in third place. In the CAA tournament, they defeated Northeastern in the first round, before losing to College of Charleston in the semifinals. Despite finishing the season with 20 wins, they declined to participate in a postseason tournament.

Offseason

Departures

Incoming transfers

2017 recruiting class

Preseason 
In a poll of league coaches, media relations directors, and media members at the CAA's media day, the Tigers were picked to finish in second place in the CAA. Senior guard Mike Morsell was named to the preseason All-CAA second team.

Roster

Schedule and results

|-
!colspan=12 style=| Exhibition

|-
!colspan=12 style=| Non-conference regular season
|-

|-
!colspan=12 style=| CAA regular season

|-
!colspan=12 style=| CAA tournament

Source

See also
2017–18 Towson Tigers women's basketball team

References

Towson Tigers men's basketball seasons
Towson